The 2015–16 season will be the 112th year of Beşiktaş J.K. and their 57th consecutive year in the Süper Lig.

Club

Board of Directors

Technical Staff

Medical Staff

Grounds 
Atatürk Olympic Stadium and Fatih Terim Stadium is the home stadium for Beşiktaş; however, their new home stadium, the Vodafone Park, will finish construction in 2016.

Kit 

Uniform Manufacturer: Adidas 
Chest Advertising's: Vodafone 
Back Advertising's: Beko 
Arm Advertising's: Kalde 
Short Advertising's: Coca-Cola

Sponsorship

Squad

On loan

Transfers

In

Out

Loans in

Loans out

Competitions

Süper Lig

League table

Result summary

Results by round

Matches

Turkish Cup

Group stage

Round of 16

Quarter-finals

UEFA Europa League

Group stage

Squad statistics

Appearances and goals

|-
|colspan="14"|Players away on loan:

|-
|colspan="14"|Players who left Beşiktaş during the season:

|}

Goalscorers

Disciplinary record

References

Turkish football clubs 2015–16 season
Beşiktaş J.K. seasons
Turkish football championship-winning seasons